The Coryell County Courthouse is an historic building located at Courthouse Square in Gatesville, Texas, the seat of Coryell County. Built in 1897–98, it was the county's third courthouse; Architect Wesley Clark Dodson, A designer of many Civil Buildings in Texas, designed the Beaux Arts building. In his design, Dodson modified the traditional cross-axial plan to allow for the erection of a central tower. By moving the district courtroom to a position alongside the tower rather than centered underneath it, he was able to extend the masonry support walls to the ground and support the tower. An important feature of the court house is the Massive Classical porticos, differing somewhat in scale and treatment, define the north and south entries. The south portico has paired corner columns, while the north has single columns. The porticos rise from a one-story base of rusticated stone with arched entries in the lower level. The openings flanking the central arch are smaller on the north facade. Red sandstone Corinthian columns support white sandstone pediments, with the five pointed star of Texas inset in contrasting carved stone.

The courthouse was added to the National Register of Historic Places in 1977.

See also

National Register of Historic Places listings in Coryell County, Texas

References

Courthouses on the National Register of Historic Places in Texas
County courthouses in Texas
Buildings and structures in Coryell County, Texas
Wesley Clark Dodson buildings
Clock towers in Texas
Government buildings completed in 1898
National Register of Historic Places in Coryell County, Texas
Recorded Texas Historic Landmarks